Let Go of Your Bad Days is the second album released by Canadian power pop group The Salteens.

Track listing

2003 albums
The Salteens albums